The Sexes Throughout Nature is a book written by Antoinette Brown Blackwell, published by G. P. Putnam's Sons in 1875.

Overview and print history
The book critiques Charles Darwin four years after he published The Descent of Man, and Selection in Relation to Sex in 1871, and Herbert Spencer, whom the author thought were the most influential men of her day. Darwin had written a letter to her in 1869, thanking her for a copy of her book, Studies in General Science. She also answers Dr. E. H. Clarke and his book Sex and Education which she deplored. Blackwell's book was republished by Hyperion Press in 1976, 1985 and 1992. Parts of the book were first published in Woman's Journal and Popular Science Monthly.

Blackwell chose to highlight balance and cooperation rather than struggle and savage rivalry. She criticized Darwin for basing his theory of evolution on "time-honored assumption that the male is the normal type of his species". She wrote that Spencer scientifically subtracts from the female and Darwin as scientifically adds to the male. It was not until one century later that feminists were working from inside the natural sciences, and could address Darwin's androcentricity.

Sarah Blaffer Hrdy wrote in her book Mother Nature: A History of  Mothers, Infants and Natural Selection (quoting from an excerpt of pages 12–25 in AnthroNotes for educators published by the National Museum of Natural History),
"For a handful of nineteenth-century women intellectuals, however, evolutionary theory was just too important to ignore. Instead of turning away, they stepped forward to tap Darwin and Spencer on the shoulder to express their support for this revolutionary view of human nature, and also to politely remind them that they had left 
out half the species."

Hrdy added, "Evolutionary biology did eventually respond to these criticisms, yet in their lifetimes, the effect that these early Darwinian feminists—Eliot, Blackwell, Royer, and a few others—had on mainstream evolutionary theory can be summed up with one phrase: the road not taken."

Contemporary reviews

Popular Science said it is a "monograph, written to establish, on scientific grounds, the equality of the sexes throughout Nature". "Mrs. Blackwell seems to us quite oblivious of the difficulties of the task here undertaken". And, regarding maternity, "Denying, as we do, the equality of the sexes, and holding to the superiority of the female sex, we protest against the degradation of woman implied...".

Publishers Weekly thought it was an "important contribution to the famous 'sex and education' controversy...".

The Unitarian Review said the "modesty of its preface, at the outset, ought to disarm of his prejudices any reader who can see only superficiality and pretense in the efforts of women after the higher sciences".

The editor Percy M. Wallace made fun of the book in the notes of the 1897 edition of Tennyson's The Princess: "When the man wants weight, the woman takes it up,/And topples down the scales". Explained in a note by "when the man neglects the proper functions of his supremacy, the woman assumes them, and the result is a subversion of the order of nature" followed by a quote of pages 96 and 97 in which Blackwell notes that whenever brilliant-colored male birds acquire maternal instincts, the females acquire male characteristics.

Contents
Sex and Evolution
The Statement
The Argument
The Alleged Antagonism Between Growth and Reproduction
Sex and Work
The Building of a Brain
The Trial by Science

Notes

Bibliography

External links

1875 non-fiction books